Oshwal Academy Nairobi Junior High is a private secondary school based in 1st Parklands Avenue in Nairobi, Kenya. It was established in 2005 after the merger of Oshwal High, Oshwal Jain Primary and Visa Oshwal Secondary and Visa Oshwal Nursery into Oshwal Academy Nairobi. It offers the IGCSE British curriculum. The headmaster is Mr. C.Banerjee.

Grade levels 
Students enter Oshwal Academy Nairobi Junior High from year 7 and continue to study till year 11.

Courses 
From year seven to nine, it is mandatory for students to take the following classes:

 Mathematics
 English
 Biology
 Chemistry
 Physics
 Art
 Business Studies and Accounting
 Foreign Language – Swahili, French or Gujarati or Hindi
 Physical Education
 Geography
 History
 Music/Drama
 Computers

During year 10, students choose Business or Sciences. For a student taking Business courses taken are:

 Business Studies
 Accounting
 History or Geography
 English
 Math
 Foreign Language – Swahili, French or Gujarati
 Economics or Computers
 PE

For a student taking Sciences courses taken are:

 English
 Math
 Physics
 Chemistry
 Biology
 Foreign Language
 Economics or Computers
 PE
 Optional – Human Biology.

The subjects may vary, as students may wish to take Physics and Chemistry but not Biology. Nowadays the school is allowing students to take any combination they like, but the number of subjects that they allow is fixed.

Houses 
There are four houses in Oshwal High School:

 Simba (red)
 Gazelle (green)
 Impala (blue)
 Flamingo (yellow)

The four houses compete against each other in activities such as sport and drama.

The school has merged with other schools owned by the "Oshwal Trust" and is part of Oshwal Academy Nairobi, having five campuses, namely:

 Oshwal Academy Nairobi – Nursery
 Oshwal Academy Nairobi – Primary
 Oshwal Academy Nairobi – Junior High
 Oshwal Academy Nairobi – Senior High
 Oshwal Academy Nairobi – College

References 

Schools in Nairobi
Educational institutions established in 2005
Private schools in Kenya
High schools and secondary schools in Kenya
2005 establishments in Kenya